Manuel Sanroma (1977–1999) was a Spanish racing cyclist.

In late 1998 he became a stagaire in the Estepona team, winning three stages in the Tour of Venezuela. In 1999 he joined the Fuenlabrada team. In a stage in the Volta a la Comunitat Valenciana, he beat Mario Cipollini in the sprint.

He also won stages in the Volta ao Alentejo and the Tour of Asturias. In the Volta a Catalunya he started as a favorite for the second stage, but one kilometre before the finish in Vilanova i Geltru he fell head first on the curb stone. He died in an ambulance on his way to the hospital.

The only victory of the Fuenlabrada team that year after Sanroma's death was a stage win of Saúl Morales in the Tour of Venezuela. A year later, Saúl Morales died as well during an in-race accident.

References

1977 births
1999 deaths
Spanish male cyclists
Cyclists who died while racing
Sport deaths in Spain
Sportspeople from the Province of Ciudad Real